The 43rd International 500-Mile Sweepstakes was held at the Indianapolis Motor Speedway on Saturday, May 30, 1959. The event was part of the 1959 USAC National Championship Trail and was also race 2 of 9 in the 1959 World Championship of Drivers.

Rodger Ward earned the first of two career Indy 500 victories. A record sixteen cars completed the full 500 miles.

All cars were required to have roll bars for the first time.

Practice and time trials
Two drivers, Jerry Unser and Bob Cortner, were killed in separate crashes during the month. On May 2, Unser lost control in Turn Four, spun, and flipped down the main stretch. The car caught fire and Unser suffered significant burns; he died from complications of his burns on May 17. On May 19, rookie Cortner crashed in turn three after being pushed by a wind gust. He was killed instantly of head injuries.

On the morning of pole day, Tony Bettenhausen suffered a bad crash during a practice run. His car hit the outside wall and flipped over the inside guardrail. Bettenhausen escaped the crash with only minor injuries, and would qualify on the second weekend of time trials.

After three years of retirement, Duane Carter returned to the cockpit, and qualified for his ninth Indianapolis 500 start.

Time trials were scheduled for four days:
Saturday May 16 – Pole Day time trials
Sunday May 17 – Second day time trials
Saturday May 23 – Third day time trials
Sunday May 24 – Fourth day time trials

Box score 

Notes
 – Includes 1 point for fastest lead lap

Alternates
First alternate: Rex Easton  (#39, #45)

Failed to qualify

Russ Congdon  (#72) - Did not finish rookie test
Bob Cortner  (#51) - Fatal accident
Chuck Daigh  (#98)
Jimmy Davies (#53)
Don Edmunds (#54, #57, #76)
Jack Ensley  (#92)
Gene Force (#55, #78)
Andy Furci  (#91)
Elmer George (#21)
Bill Homeier (#42, #62)
Van Johnson  (#76, #91)
Johnny Kay  (#17) - Did not finish rookie test
Ralph Ligouri  (#12, #41)
Johnny Moorhouse  (#91)
Earl Motter  (#21)
Jim Packard  (#55)
Johnnie Parsons (#45)
Chuck Rodee  (#82)
Eddie Russo (#1, #78, #93, #98)
Bob Schroeder  (#78)
Shorty Templeman (#69, #76)
Johnnie Tolan (#43)
Jerry Unser (#57) - Fatal accident
Wayne Weiler  (#39) - Entry declined, failed physical
Dempsey Wilson (#34, #82)

Race notes 
Fastest lead lap: Johnny Thomson – 1:01.89
Two drivers, Jerry Unser and Bob Cortner, were killed as a result of accidents during practice for this race.
Bobby Grim qualified 5th and won the Rookie of the Year award despite dropping out of the race before the halfway point. On lap 85, he suffered magneto failure, and began coasting to the pits. As was customary for drivers of the time, he raised his arm to signify to the other drivers he had lost power. However, due to the high speed he was still traveling, he dislocated his arm in the process. Visibly in pain, the crew thought he was coming in for relief, and quickly Jack Turner jumped behind the wheel, but the car would not run.
The first scoring pylon, a famous landmark of the Speedway, was constructed at the south end of the pit area.
Last year's winner Jimmy Bryan using the same exact car that won the race in 1957 and 1958 fell out of the race being left on the grid with a clutch failure to finish last (33rd).

Championship standings after the race

Formula One Drivers' Championship standings

Formula One Constructors' Championship standings

 Notes: Only the top five positions are included for both sets of standings. Also, points were not awarded in the 500 towards the F1 constructors championship.

Broadcasting

Radio
The race was carried live on the IMS Radio Network. Sid Collins served as chief announcer. Fred Agabashian joined the crew for the first time as "driver expert." The broadcast reached 385 affiliates, including Fairbanks, Alaska.

References

External links
Indianapolis 500 History: Race & All-Time Stats – Official Site

Indianapolis 500
Indianapolis 500
Indianapolis 500 races
Indianapolis 500
Indianapolis 500
Indianapolis 500